Lake Brooks Seaplane Base  is a public-use seaplane base located near Brooks Camp in Katmai National Park, in the Lake and Peninsula Borough of the U.S. state of Alaska. It is owned by the U.S. Department of the Interior.

As per Federal Aviation Administration records, this airport had 4,295 passenger boardings (enplanements) in calendar year 2007, an increase of 86% from the 2,304 enplanements in 2006.

Facilities 
Lake Brooks Seaplane Base has one seaplane landing area measuring 5,000 by 4,000 feet (1,524 x 1,219 m) on Naknek Lake.

Statistics

References

External links 
 FAA Alaska airport diagram (GIF)

Airports in Lake and Peninsula Borough, Alaska
Seaplane bases in Alaska